Chiloglanis modjensis is a species of upside-down catfish (Mochokidae) endemic to Ethiopia.  This species grows to a length of  SL.

References

External links 

modjensis
Freshwater fish of Africa
Fish of Ethiopia
Endemic fauna of Ethiopia
Taxa named by George Albert Boulenger
Fish described in 1904